Aydin Province may refer to:

Aydın Province, one of the provinces of the Republic of Turkey
Aidin Eyalet, one of the eyalet of the Ottoman Empire
Aidin Vilayet, one of the vilayet of the Ottoman Empire

Province name disambiguation pages